The Leopardstown Stakes was a Group 3 flat horse race in Ireland open to two-year-old thoroughbreds. It was run at Leopardstown over a distance of 7 furlongs (1,408 metres), and it was scheduled to take place each year in late October.

History
The event was formerly known as the Mullion Stakes. It used to be staged in late July or early August. For a period it held Listed status.

The race became known as the Ardenode Stud Stakes in the early 1980s. It was promoted to Group 3 level and switched to late October in 1984. It was subsequently called the Leopardstown Stakes. It was discontinued after 1994.

Records
Leading jockey since 1986 (2 wins):
 Dermot Hogan – Antic Boy (1986), Foresee (1992)
 David Parnell – Tursanah (1988), Tanwi (1989)

Leading trainer since 1986 (3 wins):
 John Oxx – Antic Boy (1986), Foresee (1992), Cajarian (1993)

Winners 1986–94

Earlier winners
 1971: All Spirit
 1972: Chamozzle
 1973: Furry Glen
 1974: Piping Rock
 1975: Icing

 1976: Captain James
 1977: Fujiwara
 1978: Magic North
 1979: Nazwa
 1980: Light Here

 1981: Fly Start
 1982: Burslem
 1983: Executive Pride
 1984: Leading Counsel
 1985: Toca Madera

See also
 List of Irish flat horse races

References
 Racing Post:
 pedigreequery.com – Leopardstown Stakes – Leopardstown.

Flat races in Ireland
Flat horse races for two-year-olds
Discontinued horse races
Leopardstown Racecourse